Ranjeev Puri (born  1984) is a Michigan politician and a member of the Michigan House of Representatives. He is the House Majority Whip and is serving his second term in the Michigan House, representing Canton Township in the 24th House District.

Before joining the Legislature, Puri worked in financial consulting and then went on to work for President Barack Obama. Puri received his undergraduate degree in economics and finance and went on to receive his MBA from the University of Chicago Booth School of Business in 2014.

Early life and education
Puri was born around 1984 in Racine, Wisconsin to immigrant parents. Puri earned a bachelor's degree in economics from Ohio State University. In 2014, Puri earned a Master's of Business Administration from the Booth School of Business at the University of Chicago.

Career
Puri worked on Barack Obama's presidential campaign. Since 2013, Puri worked in business development for Fiat-Chrysler. Puri is affiliated with the Michigan Indian American Democratic Caucus. Puri was endorsed by the then-incumbent state representative Kristy Pagan when he ran in the primary for the Michigan House of Representatives seat representing the 21st district. On August 4, 2020, Puri won this primary. On November 3, 2020, Puri won the general election for this seat, assumed office on January 1, 2020. In response to the February 13th, 2023 Michigan State University shooting, Puri released a statement which included the phrase "Fuck your thoughts and prayers."

Personal life
Puri resides in Canton, Michigan. Puri is married and has three children. Puri is Sikh.

References

Living people
1980s births
American politicians of Indian descent
Asian-American people in Michigan politics
American Sikhs
Chrysler people
Democratic Party members of the Michigan House of Representatives
Ohio State University College of Arts and Sciences alumni
People from Canton, Michigan
People from Racine, Wisconsin
University of Chicago Booth School of Business alumni
21st-century American politicians